Attorney General Palmer may refer to:

A. Mitchell Palmer (1872–1936), Attorney General of the United States
Edward Palmer (Canadian politician) (1809–1889), Attorney General of the Colony of Prince Edward Island
Geoffrey Palmer (politician) (born 1942), Attorney-General of New Zealand
Henry Wilbur Palmer (1839–1913), Attorney General of Pennsylvania
James Bardin Palmer (1771–1833), Attorney General of the Colony of Prince Edward Island
Roundell Palmer, 1st Earl of Selborne (1812–1895), Attorney General for England and Wales
Sir Geoffrey Palmer, 1st Baronet (1598–1670), Attorney General for England and Wales

See also
General Palmer (disambiguation)